The King & I is a collaborative album by American singer Faith Evans and late rapper The Notorious B.I.G., released by Rhino Entertainment Company on May 19, 2017.

Commercial performance 
In the United States of America The King & I  debuted at number 65 on the Billboard 200, with 9,000 album-equivalent units. As of February 2018, it sold 24,000 copies in the United States.

Track listing

Notes
  denotes co-producer

Sample credits
 "Legacy" – "Would You Die For Me?"
 "Can't Get Enough" – "Bust A Nut".
 "Don't Test Me" – "Gettin' Money (The Get Money Remix)".
 "Tryna Get By" – "Sky's The Limit".
 "The Reason" – "Why You Tryin' To Play Me". Licensed by Xtra Large Entertainment on behalf of Derrick Hodge and LeTroy Davis.
 "I Don't Want It" – Reference track for "We Don't Need It" by Lil' Kim, previously unreleased.
 "Ten Wife Commandments" – "Ten Crack Commandments".
 "A Little Romance" – "Fuck You Tonight".
 "Got Me Twisted" – "Things Done Changed".
 "When We Party" – "Going Back To Cali".
 "Somebody Knows" – "Who Shot Ya?".
 "Take Me There" – Reference track for "Drugs" by Lil' Kim, previously unreleased.
 "One In The Same" – "Respect".
 "Lovin' You for Life" – "Miss U".
 "NYC" – "Mumblin' and Whisperin.

Charts

References

2017 albums
Faith Evans albums
The Notorious B.I.G. albums
Collaborative albums
Albums published posthumously
Albums produced by Battlecat (producer)
Albums produced by DJ Premier
Albums produced by Fredwreck
Albums produced by James Poyser
Albums produced by Just Blaze
Albums produced by Salaam Remi
Albums produced by Sean Combs
Albums produced by Stevie J